Emmanuel Omogbo (born May 28, 1995) is a Nigerian-American professional basketball player for KB Vëllaznimi of the Kosovo Basketball Superleague. He played college basketball for South Plains and Colorado State before playing professionally in Italy, Lithuania and Israel. Standing 6 ft 8 in (2.03 m), he plays at the power forward and center positions.

Early life and college career
Omogbo was born in Lagos, Nigeria and raised in Hyattsville, Maryland. Omogbo attended Princeton Day Academy in Lanham, Maryland, where he averaged 14.2 points per game.

Omogbo stated his college career with the South Plains College's Texans, where he averaged 17.0 points per game to go along with 10.1 rebounds per game in his sophomore year. He was selected as a preseason junior college All-American by the Sporting News, and earned second-team JuCo All-America following the season from the NJCAA.

Omogbo played for the Colorado State University's Rams from 2015 to 2017. He finished his CSU career with 28 double-doubles, which is seventh all-time on the MW career list, and his 9.24 rebounds in 69 career games ranks as the fifth-best mark in league annals. Ranks on CSU's top-20 list in career offensive, defensive and total rebounds despite playing just two seasons. On March 17, 2017, Omogbo was named to the NABC All-District (17) first team.

Professional career

2017–18 season
After being undrafted in the 2017 NBA Draft, he joined the Golden State Warriors for the 2017 NBA Summer League.

On July 22, 2017, Omogbo started his professional career with Victoria Libertas Pesaro of the Italian LBA, signing a one-year deal. In 30 games played for Pesaro, he finished the season as the league third-leading rebounder (8.9 per game) and second in steals (1.7 per game), he also averaged 10.8 points and 1.3 assists per game.

2018–19 season
On August 17, 2018, Omogbo signed with the Lithuanian team BC Pieno žvaigždės for the 2018–19 LKL season. On October 20, 2018, Omogbo recorded a career-high 26 points, shooting 10-for-14 from the field, along with nine rebounds and four steals in an 87–81 win over Lietkabelis. In 16 games played for Pieno žvaigždės, he averaged 12 points, 5 rebounds, 1.5 steals while shooting 56.8 percent from the field.

On February 6, 2019, Omogbo parted ways with Pieno žvaigždės to join Ironi Kiryat Ata of the Israeli Israeli National League for the rest of the season. In 10 games played for Kiryat Ata, he averaged a double-double of 15.2 points and 10.2 rebounds per game.

2019–20 season
On July 26, 2019, Omogbo signed with Pallacanestro Biella of the Italian Serie A2 Basket. He averaged 11.3 points and 7.3 rebounds per game.

2020–21 season
On September 8, 2020, Omogbo signed with Club Baloncesto Peñas Huesca of the Spanish LEB Oro.
On January 20, 2021, he joined KB Vëllaznimi of Kosovo Basketball Superlegue. He averaged 18.9 points and 12.0 rebounds per game.

2021-22 season 
On August 6, 2021, Omogbo signed with Cytavision APOEL Nicosia of the Cypriot Division A.

Nigeria national team
He has been part of Nigeria's national team at the AfroBasket 2021 in Kigali, Rwanda.

References

External links
 Colorado State bio
 RealGM profile

1995 births
Living people
American expatriate basketball people in Israel
American expatriate basketball people in Italy
American expatriate basketball people in Lithuania
American men's basketball players
Basketball players from Maryland
BC Pieno žvaigždės players
Colorado State Rams men's basketball players
Centers (basketball)
Ironi Kiryat Ata players
Nigerian expatriate sportspeople in Cyprus
Nigerian men's basketball players
People from Hyattsville, Maryland
Power forwards (basketball)
Sportspeople from Lagos
South Plains Texans basketball players
Victoria Libertas Pallacanestro players